The NCL or National Conference League Division two (known as the Kingstone Press NCL Division Two)

League Winners

2019 Teams 
West Bowling A.R.L.F.C.

Ince Rose Bridge

Wigan St Judes

Hull Dockers

Barrow Island ARLFC

Crosfields ARLFC

Bradford Dudley Hill

Clock Face Miners

Beverley ARLFC

East Leeds A.R.L.F.C.,

Shaw Cross Sharks

Askam ARLFC

Promoted teams 2019:

West Bowling (as champion), Ince Rose Bridge and Hull Docker

Relegated teams 2019:

East Leeds, Shaw Cross Sharks and Askam.

References

2
1993 establishments in England
Sports leagues established in 1993